Newton Holanda Gurgel (November 1, 1923 – April 6, 2017) was a Brazilian prelate of the Catholic Church.

Gurgel was born in Acopiara, Brazil and ordained a priest on December 17, 1949. Gurgel was appointed auxiliary bishop of the Diocese of Crato on April 10, 1979 as well as titular bishop of Gummi in Byzacena and was consecrated on May 27, 1979. Gurgel was appointed bishop of the Diocese of Crato  on November 24, 1993, where he served until his retirement on May 2, 2001. Gurgel died in Crato, Ceará on April 6, 2017 as a result from multiple organ failure and respiratory failure.

References

External links
Catholic-Hierarchy
Diocese of Crato 

1923 births
2017 deaths
People from Ceará
20th-century Roman Catholic bishops in Brazil
Roman Catholic bishops of Crato
Brazilian Roman Catholic bishops